Leptodontidium is a genus of fungi belonging to the family Leptodontidiaceae.

The species of this genus are found in Europe and Australia.

Species:

Leptodontidium aciculare 
Leptodontidium aureum 
Leptodontidium beauverioides

References

Helotiales